"Ordeal" is the nineteenth episode aired of the first series of UFO, a 1970 British television science fiction series about an alien invasion of Earth. The screenplay was written by Tony Barwick and the director was Ken Turner. The episode was filmed from 8 August to 20 August 1969, and aired on ATV Midlands on 14 April 1971. Though shown as the nineteenth episode, it was actually the ninth to have been filmed.

The series was created by Gerry Anderson and Sylvia Anderson with Reg Hill, and produced by the Andersons and Lew Grade's Century 21 Productions for Grade's ITC Entertainment company.

Story
Col. Foster gets drunk at a party the night before a scheduled fitness check at a SHADO-run health farm (featured in this sequence on the soundtrack is The Beatles' single "Get Back"). He passes out in a sauna at the farm, and awakens just as aliens are kidnapping him. The aliens put Foster in a UFO and take off. Foster's friend and colleague, Captain Waterman in command of Skydiver, is ordered to destroy the UFO carrying Foster. However, Waterman, flying Sky One, cannot bring himself to do so: instead he uses Sky One to disable it, forcing a crash-landing on the Moon, where Foster is rescued by Moonbase operatives.

Inside Moonbase, they find that Foster has been put in a spacesuit and made to breathe the liquid that the aliens must breathe in order to survive the journey from their home planet. When his helmet is removed, he struggles to re-adapt to breathing air. He then awakens properly back inside the sauna, realising that he was simply imagining the abduction while all along he was safely on Earth.

The episode ends with Foster singing a rendition of Beautiful Dreamer.

Cast

Starring
 Ed Bishop — Commander Edward Straker
 George Sewell — Col. Alec E. Freeman
 Michael Billington — Col. Paul Foster
 Gabrielle Drake — Lt. Gay Ellis
 Vladek Sheybal — Dr. Douglas Jackson
 Dolores Mantez — Lt. Nina Barry
 Gary Myers — Capt. Lew Waterman
 Keith Alexander — Lt. Keith Ford
 Ayshea — Lt. Ayshea Johnson

Other cast
 Basil Moss — Dr. Frazer	
 Quinn O'Hara — Sylvia Graham
 Jeremy Wilkin — Lt. Gordon Maxwell
 David Healy — Joe Franklin	
 Joseph Morris — Medic	
 Peter Burton — Perry	
 Mark Hawkins — Lt. Gary North

Production notes
Locations used for the filming included Neptune House at ATV Elstree Studios, Borehamwood.

The music used for the opening party scene is The Beatles' "Get Back". The instrumental playing during the subsequent party flashback scene is "Trampoline" by The Spencer Davis Group. The song "Beautiful Dreamer" sung by Foster while in the sauna at the end is by Stephen Foster written in the early 1860s.

References

External links

1971 British television episodes
UFO (TV series) episodes